Natalia Alexeievna, Tsarevna of Russia (25 June 1755 – 26 April 1776) was the first wife of Paul Petrovich, Tsarevich of Russia (future Emperor Paul I), son of the Empress Catherine II. She was born as Princess Wilhelmina Louisa of Hesse-Darmstadt as the fifth child of Louis IX, Landgrave of Hesse-Darmstadt and his spouse Countess Palatine Caroline of Zweibrücken.

Life

Early years
Born in Prenzlau, Uckermark, Brandenburg, Prussia, as the sixth child and fourth daughter of the nine children born from the Landgravial couple, Wilhelmina Louisa Augusta of Hesse-Darmstadt was brought up under the strict supervision of her mother, nicknamed "The Great Landgräfin", famed as one of the most learned women of her time and who befriended several writers and philosophers of her time, such as Goethe, Herder and other celebrities of that time. Already in her youth, Wilhelmina was distinguished by an outstanding mind, strong character and ardent temperament.

Journey to Russia and Marriage
In 1772, Tsarevich Pavel Petrovich of Russia was 18-years-old, and his mother, Empress Catherine II, began the search for a bride for him. After a long search, two candidates remained: Sophia Dorothea of Württemberg and Wilhelmina. But Sophia Dorothea was just 13-years-old, and Catherine II urgently needed an heir, so the Empress was forced to opt for one of the remaining three unmarried daughters of the Landgrave; however, this option did not please her. In a letter to her envoy, she wrote:

King Frederick II of Prussia — to whom Catherine turned for "recommendations" in this matter — wanted the marriage, moreover because the Landgrave's eldest daughter Frederica was married to the heir of the Prussian throne and so, an alliance between Prussia and Russia would be a beneficial outcome.

In October 1772, Catherine wrote to Nikita Ivanovich Panin:

Unable to decide which one was worthy, the Empress sent an invitation to Wilhelmina, her sisters and their mother to visit Russia. The three Princesses studied to perfect their French, worked on their dancing, practiced dropping deep curtseys, and completed their wardrobes. Their first stop was in Berlin where from there a flotilla of four ships, sent by Catherine, which took them to Russia. It was the Grand Duke Paul's best friend, young Andrei Razumovsky, who commanded the frigate that carried the young ladies and their mother. He was immediately captivated by these charming passengers, and was particularly taken with Wilhelmine. She was not insensible to the admiration of Andrei.

The meeting of the Tsarevich with the Hessian princesses occurred in Gatchina on 15 June 1773. Paul chose Wilhelmina; she was very pretty, gay and exuberant, and the heir of the Russian throne was very delighted with her. Catherine wrote:

On 27 June 1773 the Landgravine of Hesse-Darmstadt and her three daughters were awarded with the Order of Saint Catherine. Almost one month later, on 15 August, Princess Wilhelmina was accepted in the Orthodox faith with the name and title of Grand Duchess Natalia Alexeievna, and the next day her betrothal with the Tsarevich Paul took place amidst great ostentation.

Tsarevna

On 29 September 1773, the wedding between Tsarevich Paul Petrovich and Natalia Alexeievna took place in the Church of the Nativity of the Most Holy Theotokos (currently Kazan Cathedral). Very soon she showed her domineering and impetuous nature: the English envoy James Harris, 1st Earl of Malmesbury noted that she "ruled her husband despotically, without even giving herself the trouble to show the least attachment to him."

During the first few months of her marriage, Natalia's gaiety and spontaneity animated the whole court. The Empress was delighted with her initially, but as time passed difficulties started to appear. The new Tsarevna's union was a failure: although Paul Petrovich loved his wife, Natalia was disappointed with her life as a married woman; for this, she began several political intrigues against Catherine II in order to help her husband to take the throne, because she felt such a need to accede to power due to her disastrous conjugal life. In addition, the Tsarevna refused to learn Russian and, being raised in modern Europe, showed certain independence in her statements, adhering to liberal ideas and even occasionally advocated the liberation of the peasants. Catherine II clearly didn't like her daughter-in-law's behavior. She wrote:

Despite the fact that the Tsarevna wasn't in love with her husband, she used her influence over him and tried to keep him away from everyone except for a narrow circle of her friends. According to contemporaries, the Tsarevna was a serious and ambitious woman, with a proud heart and a cool temper. In addition, she had been married for two years, but there was still no heir, to the concern of the court and the Empress.

However, in early 1776 the long-awaited pregnancy of the Tsarevna was officially announced to the court. Rumours of her affair with the charming Andrey Razumovsky aroused doubts about the real paternity of the child; however, for Catherine II didn't seem to care if was her son's or Andrei's. Natalia was carrying the heir to the Russian throne, and for the Empress, that was all that mattered.

Death

On 10 April 1776 around 4 a.m., the Tsarevna began the first labour pains. The contractions lasted for several days, and despite this, the baby couldn't be born naturally. The child died in the womb and infected the mother's body.

After five days of agonizing distress on 15 April at 5 a.m., Grand Duchess Natalia Alexeievna ultimately died after giving birth to a stillborn son.

Catherine II wrote:

Her devastated husband’s grief was so severe that he initially refused to allow Natalia’s body to be removed. Finally, Natalia was buried in the Annunciation Church of the Alexander Nevsky Lavra in Saint Petersburg.

It was widely rumored that the Empress disliked Natalia Alexeievna, and the court gossiped that she didn't allow the doctors to save her daughter-in-law. The autopsy, however, showed that the Grand Duchess had a birth defect called spinal curvature (scoliosis), and reportedly in childhood she suffered from a hunchback or stoop, which was corrected, according to the custom of that time, with a rigid corset, which led to an incorrect arrangement of the bones in such way that could be impossible for Natalia to have a baby naturally through the birth canal, and that the medicine of that time was powerless to help her.

The Chevalier de Corberon reported that no one believed the official autopsy and that Potemkin —following Catherine II's orders— visited Natalia's midwife, named Zorich, and gave her the order to kill the Grand Duchess. Also, the Chevalier questioned the surgeon Moreau during a later dinner, and he wrote:

Archives
Natalia's letters to her mother, Countess Palatine Caroline of Zweibrücken, written from the Russian court between 1773 and 1774, are preserved in the Hessian State Archive (Hessisches Staatsarchiv Darmstadt) in Darmstadt, Germany. Natalia's letters to her father, Louis IX, Landgrave of Hesse-Darmstadt, also written from Russia, are preserved in the Hessian State Archive in Darmstadt. In addition, Natalia's correspondence with her relatives, written from the Russian court between 1773 and 1776, is also preserved in the Hessian State Archive in Darmstadt.

Ancestry

References

Bibliography

 H. Troyat: Catherine the Great, 1980 
 A. Danilova: Russian emperors, German princesses. Dynastic connections, human destinies. - M .: Izografus, Eksmo-Press, 2002.
 L.N. Vasilyeva: Wives of the Russian crown. vol. II "Atlantis XXI century", 1999.
 V.G. Grigoryan: Romanovs. Biographical reference book. - AST, 2007.
 V. Korsakova: Natalya Alekseevna (Grand Duchess) - Russian Biographical Dictionary - in 25 volumes. - SPb., 1896-1918.
 E. Pchelov: Romanovs. Dynasty history. — Olma-Press, 2004.
 M.O. Logunova: Death and burial of the Grand Duchess Natalia Alekseevna // History of St. Petersburg. No. 6 (52) / 2009. - pp. 49–54.
 Description of the triumph of the highly nuptial combination of His Imperial Highness the Right-Believing Tsarevich and Grand Duke Pavel Petrovich with Her Imperial Highness the Right-Believing Empress Grand Duchess Natalia Alekseevna, which happened happily in September 1773 on the 29th day. 1773 (in Russian)

1755 births
1776 deaths
18th-century German people
18th-century German women
18th-century people from the Russian Empire
18th-century women from the Russian Empire
People from Prenzlau
Duchesses of Holstein-Gottorp
House of Hesse-Darmstadt
Russian grand duchesses by marriage
Deaths in childbirth
Landgravines of Hesse-Darmstadt
Converts to Eastern Orthodoxy from Protestantism
Burials at the Annunciation Church of the Alexander Nevsky Lavra
Paul I of Russia
Daughters of monarchs